This is a list of government and private hospitals in Malaysia.
As per 31 December 2016, there is 135 public hospitals and 9 special medical institutions in Malaysia accommodate 41,995 beds.

Government Hospitals

Johor
 Hospital Pakar Sultanah Fatimah, Muar
 Hospital Sultanah Nora Ismail, Batu Pahat
 Hospital Enche Besar Hajjah Kalsom, Kluang
 Hospital Segamat
 Hospital Pontian
 Hospital Kota Tinggi
 Hospital Mersing
 Hospital Tangkak
 Hospital Temenggung Seri Maharaja Tun Ibrahim, Kulai
 Hospital Permai Johor Bahru, Tampoi
 Sultan Ismail Hospital
 Hospital Sultanah Aminah, Johor Bahru
 Hospital Pasir Gudang (under construction)

Kedah
 Sultanah Bahiyah Hospital, Alor Setar
 Sultan Abdul Halim Hospital, Sungai Petani
 Pendang Hospital
 Kulim Hospital
 Baling Hospital
 Sik Hospital
 Langkawi Hospital
 Hospital Yan
 Hospital Jitra
 Hospital Kuala Nerang

Kelantan
 Hospital Raja Perempuan Zainab II, Kota Bharu
 Hospital Pasir Mas
 Hospital Tumpat
 Hospital Machang
 Hospital Jeli
 Hospital Tanah Merah
 Hospital Tengku Anis, Pasir Putih
 Hospital Gua Musang
 Hospital Kuala Krai
 Hospital Universiti Sains Malaysia (HUSM)

Kuala Lumpur
 Kuala Lumpur Hospital
 National Heart Institute of Malaysia (IJN)
 Hospital Canselor Tuanku Muhriz UKM (HCTM)
 University Malaya Medical Centre (UMMC)
 Hospital Angkatan Tentera Tuanku Mizan
 Hospital Rehabilitasi Cheras

Labuan
 Hospital Nukleus Labuan
 Jabatan Kesihatan Labuan

Malacca
 Malacca General Hospital
 Hospital Alor Gajah
 Hospital Jasin
 Hospital Angkatan Tentera Terendak

Negeri Sembilan
 Tuanku Ja'afar Hospital
 Hospital Tuanku Ampuan Najihah, Kuala Pilah
 Hospital Port Dickson
 Hospital Tampin
 Hospital Jelebu
 Hospital Jempol
 Hospital Rembau

Pahang
 Tengku Ampuan Afzan Hospital
 Hospital Pekan
 Hospital Kuala Lipis
 Hospital Raub
 Hospital Bentong
 Hospital Jerantut
 Hospital Jengka
 Hospital Muadzam Shah
 Hospital Sultan Haji Ahmad Shah, Temerloh
 Hospital Cameron Highlands
 Hospital Rompin
 Hospital Universiti Islam Antabangsa (UIA) Kuantan
 Hospital Bera

Penang
 Penang General Hospital
 Hospital Sungai Bakap
 Hospital Bukit Mertajam
 Hospital Balik Pulau
 Hospital Seberang Jaya
 Hospital Kepala Batas

Perak
 Hospital Batu Gajah
 Hospital Bahagia Ulu Kinta, Tanjung Rambutan
 Hospital Changkat Melintang
 Hospital Grik
 Hospital Kampar
 Hospital Kuala Kangsar
 Hospital Parit Buntar
 Hospital Raja Permaisuri Bainun, Ipoh
 Hospital Selama
 Hospital Seri Manjung
 Hospital Sg. Siput
 Hospital Slim River
 Hospital Tapah
 Hospital Taiping
 Hospital Teluk Intan
Hospital Angkatan Tentera, Pangkalan TLDM, Lumut

Perlis
 Hospital Tuanku Fauziah, Kangar

Putrajaya
 Putrajaya Hospital
 National Cancer Institute

Sabah
 Queen Elizabeth Hospital, Kota Kinabalu (I & II)
 Duchess of Kent Hospital, Sandakan
 Hospital Beaufort
 Hospital Beluran
 Hospital Keningau
 Hospital Kinabatangan
 Hospital Kota Belud
 Hospital Kota Marudu
 Hospital Kuala Penyu
 Hospital Kudat
 Hospital Lahad Datu
 Hospital Mesra Bukit Padang
 Hospital Papar
 Hospital Ranau
 Hospital Semporna
 Hospital Sipitang
 Hospital Tambunan
 Hospital Tawau
 Hospital Tenom
 Hospital Wanita dan Kanak-Kanak Sabah

Sarawak
 Sarawak General Hospital
 Sarawak General Hospital, Kota Samarahan (Cardiac services)
 Hospital Bau
 Hospital Sibu
 Hospital Miri
 Hospital Sarikei
 Hospital Sri Aman
 Hospital Limbang
 Hospital Lawas
 Hospital Kapit
 Hospital Sentosa
 Hospital Mukah
 Hospital Marudi
 Hospital Lundu
 Hospital Bintulu
 Hospital Betong
 Hospital Serian
 Hospital Simunjan
 Rajah Charles Brooke Memorial Hospital
 Hospital Kanowit
 Hospital Saratok
 Hospital Sri Aman
 Hospital Dalat

Selangor
 Hospital Shah Alam
 Hospital Ampang
 Hospital Banting
 Hospital Kajang
 Hospital Kuala Kubu Baru
 Hospital Selayang
 Hospital Serdang
 Hospital Sungai Buloh
 Hospital Tanjung Karang
 Hospital Tengku Ampuan Jemaah, Sabak Bernam
 Hospital Tengku Ampuan Rahimah, Klang
 Universiti Putra Malaysia Teaching Hospital
 Universiti Teknologi MARA Teaching Hospital, Puncak Alam

Terengganu
 Hospital Sultanah Nur Zahirah, Kuala Terengganu
 Hospital Dungun
 Hospital Kemaman
 Hospital Besut
 Hospital Hulu Terengganu
 Hospital Setiu

Private Hospitals

Johor
Landmark Medical Centre Sdn Bhd
KPJ Johor Specialist Hospital
 KPJ Kluang Utama Specialist Hospital
 Columbia Asia Hospital - Iskandar Puteri
 Hospital Penawar
 Pantai Hospital Batu Pahat
 Putra Specialist Hospital Batu Pahat
 KPJ Batu Pahat Specialist Hospital
 Puteri Specialist Hospital, Johor Bahru
 KPJ Bandar Maharani Specialist Hospital (Muar)
 KPJ Pasir Gudang Specialist Hospital
 Regency Specialist Hospital
 Hospital Gleneagles Medini
 Hospital Pakar Skudai
 Kempas Medical Centre
 Columbia Asia Hospital - Tebrau
 KPJ Bandar Dato' Onn Specialist Hospital

Kedah
 Pantai Hospital Sungai Petani
 Kedah Medical Centre
 Putra Medical Centre
 Mahsuri Medical Centre
 Metro Specialist Hospital
 Amanjaya Specialist Hospital
 Ins Specialist Centre

Kelantan
 Pusat Rawatan Islam An-Nisa
 Kota Bharu Medical Centre
 Perdana Specialist Hospital
Telipot Medical Centre
Hospital USAINS, USM

Kuala Lumpur
 UM Specialist Centre (UMSC)
 iHEAL Medical Centre - Mid Valley, Kuala Lumpur
 Columbia Asia Hospital - Setapak
 Global Doctors Specialist Centre 
 Columbia Asia Hospital - Setapak, Kuala Lumpur
 Prince Court Medical Centre
 ALPS Medical Centre
 Gleneagles Kuala Lumpur  (formerly Gleneagles Intan Medical)
 Damai Service Hospital (Taman Melawati) Sdn. Bhd.
 Sentosa Medical Centre
 Tung Shin Hospital
 Pantai Medical Centre
 Lourdes Medical Centre
 Poliklinik Mallal Ear, Nose, and Throat Clinic (Brickfields/KL Sentral)
 Sambhi Clinic & Nursing Home
 Damai Service Hospital
 Samuel Clinic & Specialist Maternity & Clinic for Women
 Pusat Rawatan Islam S/B
 Roopi Medical Centre
 Pusat Pakar Tawakal S/B
 KPJ Tawakkal Specialist Hospital
 Chinese Maternity Hospital
 Pantai Cheras Medical Centre
 Taman Desa Medical Centre
 Cheras Geriatric Centre
 Apollo TTDI Medical Centre
 Poliklinik Kotaraya
 Sentul Hospital
 Hospital Pantai Indah
 Hospital Danau Kota
 Pudu Specialist Centre
 Al-Islam Medical Centre (formerly Kampung Baru Medical Centre)
 Clinic Rosman - YKN Dialysis
 onemedcare - Physiotherapy, Woundcare & Beauty and Welless
 ALTY Orthopaedic Hospital

Malacca
 Pantai Hospital Ayer Keroh
 Mahkota Medical Centre
 Putra Specialist Hospital Melaka
 Oriental Melaka Straits Medical Centre

Negeri Sembilan
 Columbia Asia Hospital - Seremban
 Aurelius Hospital Nilai, Negeri Sembilan, Malaysia
 Seremban Specialist Hospital
 Senawang Specialist Hospital
 Mawar Medical Centre, Seremban, Negeri Sembilan
 CMH Specialist Hospital, Seremban, Negeri Sembilan

Penang
 Mount Miriam Cancer Hospital
 Penang Adventist Hospital
 Georgetown Medical Centre
 Lam Wah Ee Hospital
 Island Hospital
 Loh Guan Lye Specialists Centre
 Gleneagles Medical Centre
 KPJ Penang Specialist Hospital
 Bagan Specialist Centre
 Pantai Hospital Penang
 Kek Lok Si Charitable Hospital
 Sunway Medical Centre Penang, Seberang Jaya

Perak
 Columbia Asia Hospital - Taiping
 Fatimah Hospital
 Perak Chinese Maternity Hospital
 KPJ Ipoh Specialist Hospital
 Kinta Medical Centre
 Pantai Hospital Ipoh
 Pusat Pakar Rajindar Singh, Teluk Intan
 Anson Bay Medical Centre, Teluk Intan
 Maxwell Maternity & Surgical Centre
 Apollo Medical Centre
 Taiping Medical Centre
 Pantai Hospital Manjung
 KPJ Centre Manjung

Perlis 

 KPJ Perlis Specialist Hospital

Sabah
 KPJ Sabah Specialist Hospital (formerly known as Sabah Medical Centre)
 KPJ Damai Specialist Centre
 Rafflesia Medical Centre
 Gleneagles Kota Kinabalu Hospital
 Jesselton Medical Centre
 Tawau Specialist Medical Centre

Sarawak
 Columbia Asia Hospital - Bintulu
 Columbia Asia Hospital - Miri
 KPJ Sibu Specialist Medical Centre, Sibu
 Rejang Medical Centre, Sibu
 Normah Medical Specialist Centre, Kuching
 Kuching Specialist Hospital, Kuching
 Timberland Medical Centre, Kuching
 Borneo Medical Centre, Kuching
 Miri City Medical Centre, Miri
 Bintulu Medical Centre, Bintulu
 KPJ Miri Specialist Hospital, Miri

Selangor
 Alpha Specialist Centre, Kota Damansara, Petaling Jaya
 Assunta Hospital, Petaling Jaya
 Bukit Tinggi Medical Centre (formerly known as Manipal Hospitals Klang)
 Beacon Hospital, Petaling Jaya (formerly known as Beacon International Specialist Centre)
 Columbia Asia Hospital - Bukit Rimau
 Columbia Asia Hospital - Cheras
 Columbia Asia Hospital - Klang
 Columbia Asia Hospital - Petaling Jaya
 Columbia Asia Hospital - Puchong
 Columbia Asia Extended Care Hospital - Shah Alam
 Thomson Hospital, Kota Damansara (formerly known as Tropicana Medical Centre)
 NR Pusat Diagnostik, Shah Alam
 Sentosa Medical Centre, Kajang
 Tun Hussein Onn National Eye Hospital
 Subang Jaya Medical Centre (formerly known as Sime Darby Medical Centre Subang Jaya)
 BP Specialist Centre Taman Megah (formerly known as Sime Darby Specialist Centre Megah)
 Ampang Puteri Specialist Hospital
 Damansara Specialist Hospital
 Puteri Klang Medical Centre (formerly known as Kemuning Medical Centre)
 Selangor Medical Centre
 QHC Medical Centre
 Hospital Wanita Metro Klang
 KPJ Selangor Specialist Hospital
 Klinik Pakar Wanita Sheela & Rumah Bersalin
 Lam Surgery & Maternity Home S/B
 Kajang Specialist Maternity & Surgery S/B
 Sunway Medical Centre
 Kelana Jaya Medical Centre
 Darul Ehsan Medical Centre, Shah Alam
 Salam Medical Centre
 Metro IVF Centre
 Pusat Rawatan Islam (MAIS) S/B
 PJ Nursing Home
 Hospital UMRA
 Hospital Wanita Metro Banting
 Shah Alam Medical Centre
 Andalas Medical Centre
 PMMC, Shah Alam
 Putra Medical Centre, Sungai Buloh
 University Malaya Specialist Centre
 UiTM Private Specialist Centre, Sungai Buloh 
 Metro Maternity Kuala Selangor
 Pantai Hospital Klang
 Sri Kota Medical Centre, Klang
 Klang Specialist Hospital
 Andorra Women and Children Hospital
 Ara Damansara Medical Centre

Terengganu
 Kuala Terengganu Medical Centre (formerly known as Kuala Terengganu Specialist) - Kuala Terengganu
 SALAM Specialist Hospital Kuala Terengganu - Kuala Terengganu
 Hospital Pengajar UnisZa - Kuala Nerus

Pahang
 Darul Makmur Medical Centre Sdn. Bhd. - Kuantan

References

External links 

 Hospital Malaysia Information Directory
 Malaysia Private & Public Hospital Directory
 Ministry of Health Malaysia
 KPJ Johor Specialist Hospital

 
Malaysia
Hospitals
Malaysia